Swedish football champions is a title held by the winners of the highest Swedish football league played each year, Allsvenskan. Malmö FF are the holders of the record of most titles with 22 Swedish championships. After winning the 2021 Allsvenskan, Malmö FF are also the reigning Swedish football champions. The title has been contested since 1896 in varying forms of competition. The first Swedish Champions, Örgryte IS, were declared in 1896 when the club won the cup tournament Svenska Mästerskapet. This happened before there existed any Swedish national association, which was not created until 1904. The winners of Svenska Mästerskapet between 1896 and 1904 have retroactively been declared holders of the title by the Swedish Football Association (SvFF). After the creation of the SvFF, the title continued to be held by the winners of Svenska Mästerskapet until 1925, even though a Swedish first national league, Svenska Serien, started in 1910. Svenska Mästerskapet was discontinued in 1925.

In 1924–25, a new Swedish national league was created, Allsvenskan, but the Swedish Champions title wasn't awarded to the winners of that league until 1930–31. Since then, the winners of Allsvenskan are considered Swedish Champions, with a few exceptions. Between 1982 and 1990, the title was given to the winners of a play-off held after Allsvenskan was finished, and the following two years, 1991 and 1992, the title was given to the winners of Mästerskapsserien, a continuation league with the best teams from Allsvenskan.

The current trophy, Lennart Johanssons Pokal, has been awarded since 2001 with Hammarby IF being the first winners. Johansson himself handed out the trophy in Sundsvall on 27 October 2001. The first trophy which was in use from 1904 to 2000 was named von Rosen's Pokal after the first chairman of the Swedish FA Clarence von Rosen. However, in November 2000 it was discovered that von Rosen had been active in the Swedish national socialist movement during World War II which prompted the FA to give up using the old trophy.

Champions

Svenska Mästerskapet (1896–1925)

Allsvenskan (1931–1981)

Allsvenskan Play-offs (1982–1990)

Mästerskapsserien (1991–1992)

Allsvenskan (1993–present)

Performances

Total titles won by club

A total of 20 clubs have been crowned Swedish champions from Örgryte IS in 1896 until BK Häcken in 2022.  A total of 119 Swedish championships have been awarded. Malmö FF is the most successful club with 22 Swedish championships.

Total titles won by city
The 19 title-winning clubs have come from a total of 13 cities. The most successful city is Gothenburg.

Total titles won by county
The Swedish championship has been won by 19 clubs from nine counties. The most successful county is Västra Götaland.

See also 
 Svenska Mästerskapet
 Allsvenskan
 Allsvenskan play-offs
 Mästerskapsserien
 Football in Sweden
 Swedish football league system
 List of Allsvenskan top scorers
 List of Swedish youth football champions

Notes

References

Bibliography

External links 
  Swedish Football Association
  Sweden – List of Champions at the RSSSF

Champions
Sweden
champions